Karl Julius Jensen (1 January 1888 – 31 October 1965) was a Danish athlete. He competed in the men's individual cross country event at the 1912 Summer Olympics.

References

1888 births
1965 deaths
Athletes (track and field) at the 1912 Summer Olympics
Danish male long-distance runners
Olympic athletes of Denmark
Athletes from Copenhagen
Olympic cross country runners